The Sapient paradox is a question that can be formulated as "why there was such a long gap between emergence of genetically and anatomically modern humans and the development of complex behaviors?" Homo sapiens emerged as a species somewhere between 60,000 and 100,000 (or even 200,000) years ago, but the behaviour that is associated with modern humans began to emerge and accelerate only 10,000 years ago. The question was first formulated by archaeologist Colin Renfrew in 1996.

See also 
 Timeline of prehistory
 Ancient history
 The Great Filter
 Fermi paradox

References

External links 
 The Sapient Paradox: Social Interaction as a Foundation of Mind, lecture by Renfrew

Prehistory